Stand Your Ground may refer to:

 Stand Your Ground (Little Barrie album), 2006
 Stand Your Ground (Juluka album), 1984
 Stand Your Ground (Wild Horses album), 1981
 Stand Your Ground (Mike Tramp album), 2011
 "Stand Your Ground" (CSI: Miami episode)
 Stand Your Ground (novel), a book by Eric Walters
 Stand Your Ground (band), an American Christian hardcore band
 Stand-your-ground law, a law in some jurisdictions that authorizes a person to protect and defend one's own life and limb against threat or perceived threat